Nicholas Halma (31 December 1755, Sedan, Ardennes – 4 June 1828, Paris) was a mathematician and translator.

He was educated at the College of Plessis, Paris, took Holy orders, and received the title of Abbé. In 1791 he became principal of Sedan College. When this school closed in 1793, he went to Paris and entered military service as surgeon. In 1794 he was appointed secretary to the Polytechnic School. He held the chair of mathematics at the Prytanéee of Paris, and then that of geography in the military school at Fontainebleau. As librarian of the Empress Josephine and of the École des Ponts et Chaussées, he was charged to instruct the empress in history and geography.

Under the Bourbon Restoration he was appointed curator at the library of Sainte Geneviève and became a canon of Notre Dame. In 1808 he was commissioned by the minister of the interior to continue the "History of France" of Abbé Velly, and prepared the manuscript of two volumes. His most important work, however, was the editing and the translating into Latin and French of Ptolemy's Almagest (Paris, 1813–16), a task undertaken at the instance of Joseph Louis Lagrange and Jean Baptiste Joseph Delambre. He also translated the Commentaries of Theon of Alexandria (Paris, 1822–25).

Other works
Table pascale du moine Isaac Argyre (Paris, 1825);
Astrologie égyptienne (Paris, 1824);
Examen historique et critique des monuments astronomiques des anciens (Paris, 1830).

See also
List of Roman Catholic scientist-clerics

Sources
Attribution

1755 births
1828 deaths
People from Sedan, Ardennes
Greek–French translators
Catholic clergy scientists